Stratford is a suburb of Cairns in the Cairns Region, Queensland, Australia.

Geography
Stratford is  NNW of the Cairns CBD. It is bounded to the north by the Barron River. It is bounded to the east by the Captain Cook Highway. The northern part of the suburb is situated on the lower slopes (10–40 metres above sea level) of  Mount Whitfield and Lumley Hill and is used for residential housing. The southern part of the suburb is undeveloped dense bushland on the higher slopes rising to about 160 metres.

History
Stratford is in the traditional lands of the Yidiny people.

European occupation along the banks of the Barron River began in late 1876 when the Douglas Track and Smith's Track were established around Lumley Hill and Mount Whitfield, linking the new port of Cairns to the Hodgkinson goldfields. In early 1877 John Oldham built the Halfway House (also known as the Half-Way Hotel) on the bank of the Barron River. In 1878 Samuel Cochrane became the first farmer in the area when he purchased 'Lot 160', 110 acres on the southern bank of the Barron. He built a homestead which he named 'Lily Bank' and grew maize, English potatoes, sweet potatoes and pumpkins.

In 1885 Parliament approved plans for the first section of the Cairns-Herberton railway from Cairns to Redlynch, and this led to increased interest in the area. Surveyor Thomas Behan purchased a 13-acre lease with water frontage on the Barron, where he built a steam-powered rice mill (now the site of the Stratford Bowls Club) and a house, Cochrane opened the Lilybank Hotel, Alexander Finlayson opened the Range Hotel and store nearby, and Martin & Sons built the Union Sawmill on the river-bank. The land adjacent to Lily Bank farm was subdivided into 50 five- and ten-acre blocks and auctioned off as the 'River-View Estate'. Construction of the railway began in April 1886, with the lines laid to the Five-mile Siding by June 1887, and passenger services commencing on 8 October 1887. In December 1887, William Henry Boden rented Behan's house at the Five-mile and applied for a publican's license to run the premises as the 'Stratford Hotel'. Around this time the Five-Mile siding was renamed Stratford station. Another station was opened further along the line at Lilybank. The Cairns Regional Council website incorrectly attributes the suburb's name to an unidentified Australian Imperial Force veteran, 'Harry Stratford', whose alleged exploits at Gallipoli occurred several decades after the opening of Boden's Stratford Hotel and the Stratford railway siding.

On 19 July 1877 Constable Michael Dwyer of the Special Division of Escort, which guarded the transportation of gold from the Hodgkinson to Trinity Bay, was shooting scrub turkeys with a packer, William Guilfoyle, near the Halfway House Hotel, when Dwyer tripped and accidentally shot himself in the side. Badly wounded he was taken to the Hotel and Guilfoyle rode off to Old Smithfield township town to get help. He returned with George Rutherford, the local chemist, and shortly afterwards Dr Myers arrived from Cairns. Despite their best efforts, Dwyer died that evening and was buried built near the hotel. A headstone was erected, making this the first marked European grave in the Cairns area.

In 1878 Samuel Cochrane became the first farmer in the area when he purchased 'Lot 160', 110 acres on the southern bank of the Barron. He built a homestead which he named 'Lily Bank' and grew maize, English potatoes, sweet potatoes and pumpkins.

On 28 October 1951, St Augustine's Catholic Church was officially opened and blessed by the Bishop of Cairns, Thomas Cahill.

The Stratford public library opened in 1956 and underwent a major refurbishment in 2008.

Cairns Rudolf Steiner School opened on 29 January 2002.

In the 2006 census, Stratford had a population of 1,178 people.

In the 2011 census, Stratford had a population of 1,109 people.

Heritage listings
Stratford has a number of heritage-listed sites, including:
 Magazine Street: former Explosives Magazine and Detonator Store

In 2009 for the Q150 commemorations, the Stratford and Freshwater Community Association built a heritage trail, with 29 signposted sites in Stratford and 22 signposted sites in the neighbouring suburb of Freshwater, Queensland.

Amenities 
There are several restaurants, a pub, The Barron River Hotel, a service station, a newsagent, convenience store, launderette, a pizza shop, medical center, pharmacy, veterinary clinic and deli.

Cairns Regional Council operate a public library at 11 Kamerunga Road.

St Augustine's Catholic Church is at 23 Kamerunga Road. It is within the Northern Beaches Parish of the Roman Catholic Diocese of Cairns.

There is a boat ramp and floating walking at Greenbank West Road on the south bank of Barron River adjacent to the William Walter Mason Bridge. It is managed by the Cairns Regional Council.

References

Further reading
 Stratford Heritage Trail brochure by Cairns Regional Council
 Freshwater Heritage Trail brochure by Cairns Regional Council

External links 

 
 

Suburbs of Cairns